William Grason Scott (died April 5, 1882) was an American politician from Maryland. He served as a member of the Maryland House of Delegates, representing Harford County from 1878 to 1880.

Early life
William Grason Scott was born to Otho Scott. His father was one of the first lawyers in Maryland. He was the grandson of Maryland governor William Grason and nephew of judge Richard Grason. He attended Mount St. Mary's University and finished his studies in Germany and France. He studied law under Henry D. Farnandis.

Career
Scott was a Democrat. He served as a member of the Maryland House of Delegates, representing Harford County from 1878 to 1880.

Personal life
Scott was a member of St. Ignatius Catholic Church.

Scott died from scarlet fever on April 5, 1882, at the age of 35, at Guy's Hotel in Baltimore. He was buried at St. Ignatius Church Cemetery.

References

Year of birth uncertain
1840s births
1882 deaths
People from Harford County, Maryland
Mount St. Mary's University alumni
Democratic Party members of the Maryland House of Delegates
Maryland lawyers
Catholics from Maryland